Lake Vygozero is a large freshwater lake in the Republic of Karelia, in the northwestern part of Russia.

From 1933 it has been a part of the White Sea–Baltic Canal. There are more than 500 islands on the lake. Vygozero is used for its fishing. The Upper Vyg and Segezha empty into the lake.

Vygozero
LVygozero